Minvoul Airport  is an airport serving the town of Minvoul in the Woleu-Ntem Province of Gabon.

See also

 List of airports in Gabon
 Transport in Gabon

References

External links
Minvoul Airport
OurAirports - Minvoul
Google Maps - Minvoul

Airports in Gabon